The County Kildare Open Tennis Championship originally known as the County Kildare Tennis Tournament (1879-1880) then County Kildare Championship  is grass court tennis tournament held initially at Naas, County Kildare, in Ireland, established on 2 August 1881.

History
A County Kildare tennis tournament was first staged in 1879 at the Naas military barracks under the title the County Kildare Tournament. and was a It was a featured event of 1879 Men's Tennis tour and 1880 Men's Tennis tour. On 2 August 1880, a Colonel de Burgh called for a meeting of members of the Naas and Country Kildare Cricket club to discuss forming a country club for the purpose of providing archery, cricket, football, lawn tennis, polo, and pigeon shooting for local town residents.

On 1 January 1881 the County Kildare Club was formally established (later changed to Naas Lawn Tennis Club). In August 1881 the County Kildare Open Tennis Championships came into existence. In 1939 the event was won by Irish Davies Cup player George McVeagh. This tournament is still being staged today.

Champions
Notes: Challenge round: The final round of a tournament, in which the winner of a single-elimination phase faces the previous year's champion, who plays only that one match. The challenge round was used in the early history of tennis (from 1877 through 1921)  in some tournaments not all.

Men's singles
Included:

Notes

References

Sources
 Abolition of Challenge Rounds". paperspast.natlib.govt.nz. EVENING POST, VOLUME CIII, ISSUE 65, 20 March 1922. 
 Gray, John (1880–1881). "Sporting Events". The Freeman's Journal. Dublin, Ireland.
 Irish Times, The. (1887). "Tennis Events" Dublin, Ireland.
 "History – Naas LTC" (2017). Naas LTC. Naas, County Kildare, Ireland: Naas Lawn Tennis Club. 
 "Naas Chronology 134 AD – 1900 – Kildare Local History . ie". kildarelocalhistory.i.e. Co. Kildare Federation of Local History Groups. 2017. 
 Nieuwland, Alex (2017). "Tournament – County Kildare Tournament". www.tennisarchives.com. Harlingen, Netherlands: Idzznew BV.
 Routledges Sporting Annual (1882) Lawn Tennis in 1881. George Routledge and Son. London.
 Routledges Sporting Annual (1883) Lawn Tennis Principle Meetings of 1882. George Routledge and Son. London.

Further reading

 Ayre's Lawn Tennis Almanack And Tournament Guide, 1908 to 1938, A. Wallis Myers. 
 British Lawn Tennis and Squash Magazine, 1948 to 1967, British Lawn Tennis Ltd, UK.
 Dunlop Lawn Tennis Almanack And Tournament Guide, G.P. Hughes, 1939 to 1958, Dunlop Sports Co. Ltd, UK
 Lawn tennis and Badminton Magazine, 1906 to 1973,  UK.
 Lowe's Lawn Tennis Annuals and Compendia, Lowe, Sir F. Gordon, Eyre & Spottiswoode
 Spalding's Lawn Tennis Annuals from 1885 to 1922, American Sports Pub. Co, USA.
 The World of Tennis Annuals, Barrett John, 1970 to 2001.

External links
http://www.tennisarchives.com/tournament/county kildare 

Grass court tennis tournaments
Tennis tournaments in Ireland
1880 establishments in Ireland
Recurring sporting events established in 1880